Star House is a commercial building facing Victoria Harbour in Tsim Sha Tsui, Kowloon, Hong Kong. The building is located on Salisbury Road and Canton Road.

Star House has  of commercial space.

The building's name is linked to the nearby Tsim Sha Tsui Ferry Pier used by the Star Ferry. The ferry terminal is owned by The Wharf (Holdings).

History
The first Star House (Godown) was a two-storey warehouse structure built in 1923 for The Hong Kong and Kowloon Wharf and Godown Company, Limited and demolished around 1963 to make way for the current 19-floor retail and commercial concourse, which was completed around 1967.

From 1975 to 1983, the Hong Kong Museum of History was housed in a 700 m2 rented space within Star House.

Tenants
 McDonald's – basement
 Eslite Bookstore – 2-3rd floor (Star Annex of Harbour City)
 Peking Garden Restaurant – 3rd floor
 Consulate General of Cambodia in Hong Kong – 6th floor. It is one of two foreign missions located outside of Hong Kong Island.

Transport
The building is accessible within walking distance South West from Tsim Sha Tsui station of the MTR.

See also
 Ocean Terminal, Hong Kong
 Harbour City (Hong Kong)

References

External links

 Pictures of former and current Star House

Tsim Sha Tsui
Shopping centres in Hong Kong